was a female calico cat who gained fame for being a station master and operating officer at Kishi Station on the Kishigawa Line in Kinokawa, Wakayama Prefecture, Japan.

Early life
Tama was born in Kinokawa, Wakayama, and was raised with a group of stray cats that used to live close to Kishi Station. They were regularly fed by passengers and by Toshiko Koyama, the informal station manager at the time.

Career

The station was near closure in 2004 because of financial problems on the rail line. Around this time, Koyama adopted Tama. Eventually the decision to close the station was withdrawn after the citizens demanded it to stay open. In April 2006, the Wakayama Electric Railway destaffed all stations on the Kishigawa Line to cut costs. Station masters were selected from employees of local businesses near each station, and Koyama was officially chosen as the station manager.

On January 5 2007, railway officials officially awarded Tama the title of station master. As station master, her primary duty was to greet passengers.

In lieu of an annual salary, the railway provided Tama with a year's worth of cat food and a gold name tag for her collar stating her name and position. A station master's hat was specially designed and made to fit Tama, and took more than six months to complete. In July 2008, a summer hat was also issued to Tama for hotter weather. Tama's original gold name tag was stolen by a visitor on October 10 2007, but a replica was quickly made to replace it.

The publicity from Tama's appointment led to an increase in passengers by 17% for that month as compared to January 2006; ridership statistics for March 2007 showed a 10% increase over the previous financial year. A study estimated that the publicity surrounding Tama has contributed 1.1 billion yen to the local economy. "Nekonomics" refers to the positive economic impact of having a cat mascot.

On December 5 2007, Tama was recognized as the grand prize winner of the railway's "Top Station Runner Award". The year-end bonus was modified to a special cat toy and a celebratory slice of crab, which Tama was fed by the company president.

On January 5 2008, Tama was promoted to "super station master" in a ceremony attended by the president of the company, the mayor, and approximately 300 spectators. As a result of her promotion, she was "the only female in a managerial position" in the company. Her new position had an "office" — a converted ticket booth containing a litter box. Her gold name tag was modified to a gold tag with a blue background with an added "S" for "super".

On October 28, 2008, Tama was knighted and awarded the title of "Wakayama de Knight" (a pun on "It's got to be Wakayama" in Japanese) by the prefectural governor, Yoshinobu Nishizaka, for her work in promoting local tourism.

In early 2009, the Wakayama Electric Railway introduced a new  train on the line which was customized with cartoon depictions of Tama.

In January 2010, railway officials promoted Tama to the post of "Operating Officer" in recognition of her contribution to expanding the customer base. Tama maintained the station master's job while taking over the new job, and was the first cat to become an executive of a railroad corporation.

Her staff consisted of two feline assistant stationmasters: Tama's sister, and Tama's mother, an orange tabby cat named .

In August 2010, in honor of Tama's third year as stationmaster, the station building at Kishi was rebuilt with a new structure resembling a cat's face. Both the "Tama train" refurbishment and station rebuilding projects were overseen by industrial designer Eiji Mitooka.

On January 6 2011, Tama's fourth year as stationmaster was celebrated with a ceremony and her promotion to "Managing Executive Officer", third in line in management after the company president and the managing director.

On January 5 2013, at the ceremony celebrating her sixth year as stationmaster, Tama was elevated to Honorary President of Wakayama Electric Rail for life. In April 2013, it was announced that due to Tama's increasing age, her work hours would be reduced and she would only be on view in the station office Tuesday through Friday, a reduction of two days from her original Monday through Saturday hours.

Death and enshrinement

Tama died on June 22 2015, at the age of 16, of apparent heart failure at an animal hospital in Wakayama Prefecture. After her passing, thousands of her fans from all over Japan came to pay their respects. She was honored with a Shinto-style funeral at the station and was given the posthumous title "Honorary Eternal Stationmaster".

She was enshrined at a nearby Shinto cat shrine as spirit goddess  on August 11, 2015. The "Tama train" was redecorated for mourning and the first ceremonial passengers were children from a local nursery school.

After the funeral, Wakayama Electric Railway President Mitsunobu Kojima and other executives went to the area by Kishi River where Tama was born and selected stones to build her memorial. Tama's name was written in calligraphy by President Kojima and carved by a stonemason. The plaque and a bronze statue of Tama are located in a small Shinto shrine, called Tama Jinja, next to the station.

After the traditional fifty day mourning period, Tama was succeeded by her deputy, Nitama. Nitama's first official duty was to be conveyed to her predecessor's shrine to pay her respects.

In February 2016, Tama became the first inductee into the newly created Wakayama Hall of Fame and bronze relief plaque showing the story of her life was unveiled on the second floor of the Wakayama Prefectural Library.

Every year on June 23, the anniversary of Tama's death, her successors Nitama and Yontama are carried to her shrine and offerings are presented by the company president on their behalf.

Successors

Nitama

On January 5, 2012, Tama's official apprentice, named "Nitama" ("Second Tama") was revealed. Born in Okayama City in 2010, Nitama was rescued from under a train car and adopted by Okayama Electric Tramway. Nitama trained at Idakiso Station (five stops away on the same line as Kishi Station) before being chosen as Tama's apprentice.

Nitama is a medium-hair calico cat and is easily distinguished from both Tama and Yontama in pictures by her coat length. She is often drawn as endearingly fluffy on promotional materials.

After Tama's enshrinement in August 2015, Nitama was taken to the shrine to pay her respects and then formally installed as the new stationmaster.

Sun-tama-tama

"Sun-tama-tama" (a pun on "Santama", lit. "third Tama") was a calico cat sent for training in Okayama. Sun-tama-tama was considered as a candidate for Tama's successor, but the Okayama Public Relations representative who had been caring for Sun-tama-tama refused to give the cat up, writing, "I will not let go of this child, she will stay in Okayama."

As of September 2018, Sun-tama-tama is working as the stationmaster in Naka-ku, Okayama and appears occasionally on Tama's Twitter account.

Yontama

On January 6, 2017, the 10th anniversary of Tama's installment as stationmaster, Yontama ("Fourth Tama"), an eight-month-old calico, was introduced as Nitama's subordinate and the new stationmaster of Idakiso Station, the station Nitama trained at, on Nitama's days off.

In popular media

Tama is featured in the Animal Planet series Must Love Cats. The host, John Fulton, honored her with a visit and a song.

Tama made an appearance on  Chris Tarrant: Extreme Railways in the episode entitled "The Great Japanese Train Ride", Chris Tarrant visits Kishi station, meets Tama and explores the impact she has had on the local economy. Chris also meets Tama's eventual successor Nitama.

On April 29 2017, on what would have been her 18th birthday, Google honored Tama with a worldwide Google doodle.

In chapter 58 of the Japanese manga Noragami, published a few months after her death and deification, the authors honored Tama with the "rookie of the year award" as a new goddess of fortune in an in-universe ranking of the most popular Shinto deities.

In Around The World By Train With Tony Robinson presenter Tony Robinson visits Kishi station and meets Tama's successor Nitama. Tony visits Tama's shrine and looks at the impact Tama's death had on the local population.

Gallery

See also
 List of individual cats
 Stubbs, an American cat appointed honorary mayor of Talkeetna, Alaska
 Tibs the Great, British Post Office's "number one cat"
 Chief Mouser to the Cabinet Office, the title of the official resident cat of the Prime Minister of the United Kingdom at 10 Downing Street
 Palmerston (cat), resident Chief Mouser of the Foreign & Commonwealth Office
 Think Think and Ah Tsai, Cats of the President of Taiwan
 Hermitage cats in Saint Petersburg, Russia
 Canadian Parliamentary Cats

References

External links 

 

1999 animal births
2015 animal deaths
Individual cats in Japan
Railway culture in Japan